Maricopa lativittella is a species of snout moth in the genus Maricopa. It was described by Ragonot in 1887. It is found in North America, including Texas.

References

Moths described in 1887
Phycitinae